The 1876 Vermont gubernatorial election took place on September 5, 1876. Incumbent Republican Asahel Peck, per the "Mountain Rule", did not run for re-election to a second term as Governor of Vermont. Republican candidate Horace Fairbanks defeated Democratic candidate W.H.H. Bingham to succeed him.

Results

References

Vermont
1876
Gubernatorial
September 1876 events